The Hungarian Cultural Days of Cluj is the largest Hungarian festival in Transylvania. It occurs annually on 19 August, being the date when Cluj-Napoca reached city status, and on 20 August, king St. Stephen's day, as well as the whole week around these.

The cultural city days have been held from 2010 on, being organized by the Treasure Cluj Association and its partner organizations.

The participants can choose from guided tours, exhibitions, book launches, commemorations, theater plays, movies, fair, food tasting, drinks workshop, classical and contemporary concerts, parties, activities for youth, family and children, board game circles, ancient tents, handicraft workshops, as well as literary, artistic, historical, social and other conversations, that run simultaneously in a large number of locations. The language of the event is Hungarian, but certain programs are held additionally in Romanian and English.

See also
 Hungarians in Romania

References

Festivals in Romania
Cluj-Napoca
Hungarians in Romania